Panula is a genus of moths in the family Erebidae. The genus was erected by Achille Guenée in 1852.

Species
Panula inconstans Guenée, 1852
Panula sororcula Draudt & Gaede, 1944

References

Melipotini
Moth genera